So Tired may refer to:

"So Tired", a song by Haircut 100 from Paint and Paint
"So Tired" (Ozzy Osbourne song), 1983

See also
"I'm So Tired", a 1968 song by the Beatles
"Tired of Waiting for You", a 1965 song by The Kinks